Kuni or KUNI may refer to:

People
 Kuni-no-miya (久邇) ōke (princely house), the second oldest branch of the Japanese Imperial Family created from branches of the Fushimi-no-miya house
 Kuni Nagako (1903–2000), member of the Imperial House of Japan
 Kuni, an alias of the music artist, DJ, and music producer Kuniyuki Takahashi
 Kuni, a character played by Gedde Watanabe in UHF, who also appeared in an episode of The Weird Al Show

Geography
 Kuni (woreda), Ethiopia
 Kuni, Gunma, a former village in Gunma, Japan
 Kuni-kyō, an 8th-century capital of Japan
 Provinces of Japan
 Kuni, Eastern Cape, a township in Buffalo City, South Africa

Other uses
 KUNI (FM), a radio station belonging to the University of Northern Iowa, U.S.
 KUNI, the ICAO designation for Gordon K. Bush Airport near Athens, Ohio, U.S.